Regulo Carmona Moreno (born 31 January 1980 in El Paraíso, Caracas) is a retired Venezuelan male artistic gymnast. Five times winner of the World Cup (2006-2007), three times champion of the Central American and Caribbean Games (2002-2010), two times Pan American champion of the discipline (2008-2010). Becoming the best rings gymnast in Latin America of his time. The 2006 and two times in 2007 rings World Cup Champion and at other several international competitions, Regulo has competed for over a decade on the international circuit. Despite his numerous achievements at the World Championships and Worl Cup, Latinos and other events, Carmona has suffered a string of misfortunes in his career moving him away from the olympic classification.He participated at the 2011 World Artistic Gymnastics Championships in Tokyo, Japan and at other several international competitions.

Beginnings and career 
Regulo Carmona was born in Caracas, Venezuela in 1980. He began gymnastics at the age of 7, and when he was 11 years old, he was a member of the Venezuelan national youth team, representing his country in the first international youth Pan American made in Houston Texas in 1998.

Carmona established himself as a top up-and-coming gymnast at the 1998 Junior Pan American made in Houston Texas, where he won gold medal in the rings titles.

Senior career

1998 
Carmona began representing Venezuela. He competed at both the 1998 Junior Pan American, where he won a gold medal finish in rings, and the Moncada Cup in Cuba, where he placed 3rd in the rings. He competed in his third International Championships in 1999, where he helped the Venezuela team won 4th place.

1999-2004 
After discovering that his passion was gymnastics, he represented Venezuela at the Pan American Games in Winnipeg Canada in 1999, where he finished 4th place per team.

In 2000 Carmona participated in the Moncada Cup held in Cuba obtaining 3rd place.

In 2001 at the age of 21 he participated in the world championship of artistic gymnastics held in Ghent Belgium, finishing 12th place, in which the two-time world champion and Olympic medalist in rings the Bulgarian Yordan Yovchev participated.

In 2002 Carmona competed in the International Cup of artistic gymnastics in Romania he won 3rd place in rings.

In 2003 Carmona competed in the International Cup of artistic gymnastics in Romania, where he placed 2nd in rings where he suffered an index thumb. In 2003 Carmona, after his fracture, competed in rings in the Pan American games in Dominican Republic, obtaining the 2nd place, the silver medal for Venezuela.

That same year, in 2003, Regulo Carmona had a car accident, leaving him with a fractured femur and several reconstructive surgeries on his face, which kept him away from gymnastics for several months while he was rehabilitating, but even without fulfilling the time allocated for, he recovered sufficiently to win his second gold medal in rings at the 2004 competed in the Venezuelan nationals’ games.

In 2004, Carmona closed an impeccable cycle of international competitions, finishing 2nd place in the rings of the world cup in Chile behind the Dutch Yuri van Gelder.

2005-2015 
Regulo Carmona participated in multiple international artistic gymnastics events, most of them winning important places in the classification of rings. But luck did not smile on him and unfortunately he could not obtain the desired qualification for the 2008 Beijing Olympics.

In 2005 Carmona participated in the World Cup in France where he won 1st place for rings, the same year he competed in the Copa del Rey celebrated in Spain and the Panamerican Championship where he won the first place for rings in Brazil.

In 2006 Carmona participed in many sporting events, achieving excellent results in rings such as World Cup celebrated in Slovenia where he won a gold medal on the rings the same year he also participed at World Cup celebrated in Germany where he finished 2nd place. In Latin America he participated in the Central American and Caribbean Games and South American Games in both he winning the gold medal in rings.

In 2007 Carmona continues to build his international project in artistic gymnastics and the year 2007 was one of his best years participating in the international cup France where he won second place, he participated in two world cups held in Slovenia and Germany respectively in both won the gold medal. The world cup held in Russia and Belgium had the presence of the little lord of the rings, he won the third and second place respectively. The most significant achievement of his career was the 5th place in the world championship in Germany, making history has been to the first time that a Venezuelan was in the top positions of a world championship.

In 2008 Carmona in that year, he was present in three international events, in the international cup in Spain, where he finished in 5th place. The Pan American championship of the discipline in Argentina where he won the gold medal , closing his participation in the world cup in the Czech Republic, finishing in 5th place.

In 2009 Carmona was champion of the Bolivarian games in Bolivia where he won the gold medal , he also had international activity participating in the world cup in Slovenia, where he won the 3rd place .

In 2010 Carmona He competed in two Latin American events, each winning the gold medal , the Pan American Championship in Mexico and the Central American Games in Puerto Rico. That same year, Regulo Carmona seals his name in international artistic gymnastics by introducing a new element in the code.

References

1980 births
Living people
Venezuelan male artistic gymnasts
Place of birth missing (living people)
Gymnasts at the 2003 Pan American Games
Gymnasts at the 2007 Pan American Games
Gymnasts at the 2011 Pan American Games
Pan American Games gold medalists for Venezuela
Pan American Games silver medalists for Venezuela
Pan American Games medalists in gymnastics
Central American and Caribbean Games gold medalists for Venezuela
South American Games gold medalists for Venezuela
South American Games silver medalists for Venezuela
South American Games medalists in gymnastics
Competitors at the 2006 South American Games
Competitors at the 2006 Central American and Caribbean Games
Competitors at the 2010 Central American and Caribbean Games
Central American and Caribbean Games medalists in gymnastics
Medalists at the 2003 Pan American Games
Medalists at the 2007 Pan American Games
20th-century Venezuelan people
21st-century Venezuelan people